Arlene Shuler is an American arts administrator and former ballet dancer. She is the president and chief executive of the New York City Center.

Biography 
Shuler grew up in Cleveland playing ballet. She began her training at age six under Marguerite Duncan in Cleveland and then entered the School of American Ballet in New York City. At age 13, she played as the young lead in The Nutcracker with the New York City Ballet. She was joined the Joffrey Ballet at 17 and performed frequently at the New York City Center.

After a career in dancing, Schuler received her B.A. degree from Columbia University and her J.D. degree from Columbia Law School. She worked at the National Endowment for the Arts as a summer intern, which inspired her to become an arts administrator. 

Shuler began her career as program administrator of the dance program of the NEA, and then worked for Representative Ted Weiss. She returned to New York to serve as executive director of the Volunteer Lawyers for the Arts, and served executive positions in the Wallace Funds, General Atlantic Partners Foundation and the Atlantic Philanthropic Service Company. For 11 years, Shuler worked for the Lincoln Center, first as vice president of planning and development, and then as senior vice president of planning and external affairs. She then served as executive director of the Howard Gilman Foundation.

In 2003, Shuler was named president and CEO of the company. She was credited for converting the NYCC from a rental space for dance companies to a producing house that commissions revivals of Broadway shows and dance performances. Shuler started the Fall for Dance Festival, which features a number of dance companies with the aim to introduce new audiences to dance. The success of the new programs increased the center's budget from under $10 million in 2003 to $27.6 million in 2021. In December 2021, she announced her retirement at the end of the 2021–2022 season.

Shuler received the Capezio Dance Award in 2009 that awards an individual or institution whose “innovation, creativity, and imagination . . . bring respect, stature, and distinction to dance.”

Personal life 
Shuler is married to Nigel Redden, former director of the Lincoln Center Festival, Spoleto Festival USA, and Santa Fe Opera.

References 

Living people

Year of birth missing (living people)
New York City Ballet dancers
Joffrey Ballet dancers
Columbia University School of General Studies alumni
Columbia Law School alumni
American arts administrators
American nonprofit chief executives
American nonprofit executives
School of American Ballet alumni